A Massachusetts general election was held on November 8, 1994 in the Commonwealth of Massachusetts.

The election included:
 statewide elections for United States Senator, Governor, Lieutenant Governor, Attorney General, Secretary of the Commonwealth, Treasurer, and Auditor;
 district elections for U.S. Representatives, State Representatives, State Senators, and Governor's Councillors; and
 ballot questions at the state and local levels.

Democratic and Republican candidates were selected in party primaries held September 20, 1994.

Governor & Lieutenant Governor

Republicans William Weld and Paul Cellucci were re-elected Governor and Lieutenant Governor, respectively, over Democratic candidates Mark Roosevelt and Bob Massie. Weld's 43% margin of victory is the largest in the history of Massachusetts Gubernatorial elections.

Attorney General

Democrat Scott Harshbarger was reelected Attorney General. He defeated Republican Janis M. Berry in the general election.

Republican primary

Candidates
Janis M. Berry
Guy Carbone

Results

General election

Secretary of the Commonwealth

Incumbent Secretary of the Commonwealth Michael J. Connolly did not for reelection. Democrat William F. Galvin defeated former State Representative Augusto Grace in the Democratic primary and Republican State Senator Arthur E. Chase and Libertarian Peter C. Everett in the general election.

Democratic primary

Candidates
William F. Galvin, former State Representative from Allston–Brighton, Boston and nominee for Treasurer in 1990
Augusto Grace, former State Representative from Burlington

Results

Republican primary

Candidates
Arthur E. Chase, State Senator from Worcester
Peter Forman, Massachusetts House Minority Leader and State Representative from Plymouth

Results

General election

Treasurer and Receiver-General

Republican Joe Malone was re-elected Treasurer and Receiver-General. He defeated Democrat State Representative Shannon P. O'Brien, Independent Tom Tierney and Libertarian Sue Poulin.

Candidates
Joe Malone, incumbent Treasurer and Receiver-General (Republican)
Shannon P. O'Brien, State Senator from Easthampton (Democratic)
Sue Poulin (Libertarian)
Tom Tierney (Independent)

Results

Auditor

Democrat A. Joseph DeNucci was re-elected Auditor. He defeated Republican Forrester Clark and Libertarian candidate Geoff M. Weil.

Republican primary

Candidates
Forrester Clark, State Representative from Hamilton
Earle Stroll

Results

General election

United States Senator

Democratic incumbent Ted Kennedy was re-elected over Republican Mitt Romney, Libertarian Mary Fridley, and LaRouche Was Right candidate William A. Ferguson, Jr. It was the closest re-election race of Senator Kennedy's career.

Ballot questions

Question 1
Law Proposed by Initiative Petition - This initiative sought to limit the way in which business and certain nonprofit corporations could contribute to and spend money on campaigns involving an initiative, referendum or other question submitted to the voters at a state or local election. The initiative would require ballot committees organized to support or oppose any question to the voters to disclose promptly certain contributions made late in the campaign; would establish procedures that business and certain nonprofit corporations would have to follow in order to spend money on ballot question campaigns; and would establish voluntary spending limits for ballot committees.

Question 2
Referendum on an Existing Law - This referendum sought to require drivers and passengers in certain motor vehicles on public ways to wear properly adjusted and fastened safety belts.

Question 3
Referendum on an Existing Law - This referendum sought to eliminate one of the two ways in which students may authorize fees to be assessed on tuition bills at state-operated colleges and universities to support nonpartisan student organizations that attempt to influence state legislation.

Question 4
Law Proposed by Initiative Petition - This initiative sought to prevent the name of a person from being printed on a state primary ballot as a candidate for one of a number of specified state and federal offices, if the person has already served a certain number of consecutive terms in that office within a fixed period preceding the end of the then-current term of office. If such a person were still elected by write-in vote to one of the state offices (except for the office of Governor), the person would serve without a salary, and in some of the state offices, without payment for certain expenses.

Question 5
Law Proposed by Initiative Petition - This initiative sought to would allow retail stores to open at any time on Sundays and on the legal holidays of Memorial Day, July Fourth, and Labor Day. It would not affect the current restrictions on the sale of alcoholic beverages on Sundays and these holidays. Stores governed by the proposal would be required to pay most employees at least one-half times their regular rate.

Question 6
Constitutional Amendment Proposed by Initiative Petition - This initiative sought to amend the state constitution so as to require Massachusetts income tax rates to be graduated, in order to distribute the burden of the tax fairly and equitably. The proposed amendment would require the rates for taxpayers in higher income brackets to be higher than the rates for taxpayers in lower income brackets. The proposed amendment would also allow the state Legislature to grant reasonable exemptions and abatements and establish the number and range of tax brackets. The proposed amendment would eliminate from the Massachusetts Constitution the present requirement that income taxes must be levied at a uniform rate throughout the state upon incomes derived from the same class of property.

Question 7
Law Proposed by Initiative Petition - This initiative sought to change the state personal income tax laws if a proposed amendment to the Massachusetts Constitution requiring income tax rates to be graduated is approved at the 1994 state election.

Question 8
Law Proposed by Initiative Petition - This initiative sought to increase the portion of the gasoline tax revenue that would be credited to the state Highway Fund; prohibit the transfer of money from the Highway Fund to other state funds for other purposes; declare that citizens have a right to a safe and efficient public highway, road and bridge system and require the state to develop a comprehensive seven-year state transportation plan; and make certain other changes in state finance laws relating to the Highway Fund.

Question 9
Law Proposed by Initiative Petition - This initiative sought to prohibit rent control for most privately owned housing unites in Massachusetts, and would nullify certain existing rent control laws, except that cities and towns would be authorized to adopt a restricted form of rent control for a six-month period, after which compliance by property owners would be voluntary.

References

External links
 

General